George Henry Drummond, also known as George Henry de Vere Drummond (3 March 1883 – 12 October 1963) was an English banker who had been a cricketer active from 1903 to 1922 who played for Northamptonshire (Northants).

Early life
Drummond was born in Pimlico on 3 March 1883.  He was a son of George James Drummond and Elizabeth Cecile Sophia ( Norman) Drummond. He is the elder brother of Alexander Drummond. In 1902, his name was legally changed to George Henry de Vere Drummond by Royal Licence.

His maternal grandparents were Rev. Frederick John Norman and Lady Adeliza Elizabeth Gertrude Manners (a daughter of John Manners, 5th Duke of Rutland and Elizabeth Manners, Duchess of Rutland).

He appeared in fifteen first-class matches as a righthanded batsman who scored 186 runs with a highest score of 34.

Career
Drummond served as a Lieutenant in the West Kent Yeomanry and Nottinghamshire Royal Horse Artillery and fought in World War I, where he was wounded. 

He was partner of Drummond's Bank, He served as High Sheriff of Nottinghamshire in 1927 and was Member of the House of Keys in the Isle of Man between 1946 and 1951.

Personal life
On 11 January 1917, Drummond married Helena Kathleen Holt, a daughter of Thomas Grattan Holt and sister of civil engineer Herbert Samuel Holt. Before her death in 1933, they were the parents of:

 Eve de Vere Drummond (1918–1987), who married Raymond Vincent de Trafford.
 Rosemary Lucia de Vere Lucia Drummond (1919–1968), who married Lt.-Col. Neil Phipps Foster.
 Edwina Gillian de Vere Drummond (b. 1920), who married Commandant Eric R. Miville.
 Diana Kathleen Drummond (1926–1982), who married John Astor, MP for Newbury who was the youngest son of John Jacob Astor, 1st Baron Astor and Lady Violet Elliot-Murray-Kynynmound.

On 30 October 1940, he married Honora Myrtle Gladys Spiller, daughter of Lt.-Col. Duncan Wilfred Lambart Spiller. Together, they were the parents of:

 Annabella Elizabeth Sarah de Vere Drummond (b. 1941)
 George Albert Harley de Vere Drummond (b. 1943), an English banker.
 Omega Margaret de Vere Drummond (b. 1944), who married Robert Armand Yves Pouget.
 Isobel Camilla de Vere Drummond (b. 1946)

Drummond, who lived at Mount Rule, Isle of Man, died in Kirk Braddan, Isle of Man on 12 October 1963.

Notes

1883 births
1963 deaths
English cricketers
Marylebone Cricket Club cricketers
Northamptonshire cricketers
High Sheriffs of Northamptonshire
Members of the House of Keys 1946–1951
English bankers
20th-century English businesspeople